Ya-ha Hadjo (Mad Wolf Georgia ? - March 29, 1836 Florida) was a member of the Creek Nation who avoided forced relocation to Indian Territory with his band by moving south to the Florida Territory where he joined with the Seminole and retained his position as chief. In 1826 while still in Georgia, Mad Wolf visited Washington, D.C. as part of a Creek delegation.

Ya-ha Hadjo was one of the seven Seminole chiefs to travel overland to the Indian Territory to inspect the land that the United States was proposing they move to from Florida after the Treaty of Paynes Landing.

He was reportedly killed during an attack upon his encampment on the banks of the Ocklawaha River by U.S. Army troops. There was another individual named Ya-ha Hadjo who was married to one of Osceola'a sisters. It's possible the reported death in 1836 may have been a case of mistaken identity.

References

18th-century Seminole people
1836 deaths
Year of birth missing
Muscogee people
Tribal chiefs
Native American leaders
19th-century Seminole people